is a town on Okushiri Island, located in Hiyama Subprefecture, Hokkaido, Japan.

As of September 2016, the town has an estimated population of 2,812, and a density of 20 persons per km2. The total area is 142.98 km2.

Hiyama Prefectural Natural Park encompasses the entire island and town.

Etymology
The name Okushiri comes from the Ainu name Ikusyun-shiri. Iku means other side and shiri means island. However, the Japanese meaning of the two kanji used for the name mean "deep inside/innermost" and "buttocks/hips".

History
This tsunami killed 198 people in the town, despite a tsunami warning system and a seawall, and also caused landslides on the hills above. Another 32 people were missing, including 3 in Russia and 129 were injured. The subsequent fire burned down much of what remained. The island was reshaped by the tsunami, which was 10 meters high in town. The tsunami struck within five minutes of the earthquake, leaving residents absolutely no warning.
1906: The village of Okushiri was founded.
1966: Okushiri Village became Okushiri Town.
1993: Southwest Hokkaido Open Sea earthquake occurred.

Climate
Okushiri has a humid continental climate (Köppen Dfa) closely bordering on a humid subtropical climate (Cfa).

Transportation
Okushiri Island is accessible by air or sea. Okushiri Airport serves the island with daily flights to and from Hakodate Airport. Regular ferry services to and from Esashi (2 hours and 20 minutes) and Setana (1 hour and 40 minutes) are provided by Heartland Ferry, and time timetable changes seasonally.

A local bus service operates year-round.

Education
 High schools
 Hokkaido Okushiri High School
 Junior high schools
 Okushiri Junior High School
 Aonae Junior High School (closed in 2017 to merge with Okushiri Junior High School)
 Elementary schools
 Okushiri Elementary School
 Aonae Elementary School

Sister city
  Awaji, Hyogo

References

External links

Official Website 

Towns in Hokkaido